Babyfever is a 1994 American comedy-drama film directed by Henry Jaglom and starring Victoria Foyt.

Cast
Victoria Foyt as Gena
Matt Salinger as James
Dinah Lenney as Roz
Eric Roberts as Anthony
Frances Fisher as Rosie
Elaine Kagan as Milly
Zack Norman as Mark

Reception
The film has a 36% rating on Rotten Tomatoes.  Melissa Pierson of Entertainment Weekly graded the film a B−.  Lisa Schwarzbaum, also of Entertainment Weekly, graded the film a C.  Roger Ebert awarded the film three stars.

References

External links
 
 

American comedy-drama films
Films directed by Henry Jaglom
1994 comedy-drama films
1994 films
1990s English-language films
1990s American films